Vít Rakušan (born 16 June 1978) is a Czech pedagogue and politician who has served as the leader of the Mayors and Independents (STAN) political party since 2019 and its 1st vice-chairman from 2016 to 2019. He has been a member of the Chamber of Deputies since October 2017; an elected representative of the Central Bohemia Region since 2012, and was the mayor of the City of Kolín from 2010 to 2019. In 2021, he assumed the posts of First Deputy Prime Minister and Minister of the Interior in the cabinet of Petr Fiala.

Life 
Rakušan was born in Kolín. He majored in history and German studies at the University of South Bohemia in České Budějovice and school management at Charles University in Prague (earning a master’s degree and a bachelor’s degree).

Since 2000 he has run his own business, between 2000 and 2015 in the area of German language teaching. He teaches German language at Jiří Orten Grammar School /Gymnázium Jiřího Ortena/ in Kutná Hora.

Vít Rakušan is married for the second time; in September 2015 Marie Auerová became his current wife. Their son Matěj was born in October 2017 and son Jonáš in April 2020. He has a daughter Agáta from his previous marriage. He lives in Kolín. His father is the former senator elected as a member of ČSSD, Jan Rakušan.

Political work 
Since 2015 he has been a member of the STAN political party. He also holds the position of a member of the National Committee and a Vice-Chairman of the Regional Committee of the Central Bohemian Region in the party. At the 8th National Convention of STAN in Průhonice u Prahy in mid April 2016, he was elected the first vice-chairman of the party. He won 137 votes from 144 delegates (i.e., 95%).

He entered politics when he was elected in the municipal government elections in 2010 as a non-partisan candidate of the entity “Změna pro Kolín” /Change for Kolín/ to be an elected representative of the City of Kolín (he was the leader of the list of candidates). Subsequently, in November 2010 he became the mayor of the City. In the elections of 2014, he successfully defended his position as an elected representative of the city, when he once again led the list of candidates as a non-partisan candidate of “Změna pro Kolín”, which triumphed in the elections, obtaining 63.95% of votes (i.e., winning 20 mandates of 27 available in total). In November 2014, he was elected mayor of the city for the second time.

In the regional elections in 2012, he was elected as a non-partisan member of STAN as part of the entity “TOP 09” and “Starostové pro Středočeský kraj“ to the Regional Council of the Central Bohemia Region (originally, he was listed 11th on the list of candidates but he came in second due to preferential votes). He worked as a member of the Supervisory Committee.

In 2016, he was ranked among the top 100 innovators of Central and Eastern Europe announced by the prestigious English international daily Financial Times.

In the regional elections in 2016, he was the leader of STAN in the Central Bohemia Region and he managed to defend his mandate of an elected regional representative. On 18 November 2016, he was elected statutory representative and deputy mayor for safety and tourism. After the breakup of the coalition, however, he was removed from office in October 2017.

At the 9th National Convention of STAN in Prague on 25 March 2017, he was the only candidate to defend the position of the 1st vice-chairman of the party; he obtained votes from 133 of 145 delegates (i.e., 92%).

In the elections to the Chamber of Deputies of PCR in 2017, he was the leader of the STAN party in the Central Bohemia Region. He won 7,334 preferential votes and was elected deputy. Later, he was also elected chairman of the Permanent Commission for the Control of Military Intelligence, and he works on the Foreign and Security Committee of the Chamber of Deputies.

In municipal government elections in 2018, he was the national leader of STAN. In Kolín with the political grouping “Změna pro Kolín”, he defended the record setting results in 2014; the grouping won 62.82% of the votes cast, obtaining even 21 of 27 mandates. At the inaugural meeting of the council on 5 November 2018, he was elected mayor. However, he resigned the function in June 2019 due to his engagement in national politics. He was replaced by Michael Kašpar. He himself remained as a member of the City Council.

At the 10th National Convention of STAN on 13 April 2019, he was elected as the only candidate for the chairman of the party. He was elected right in the first round by 93% of the votes. He thus replaced Petr Gazdík in the function of chairman, who had decided not to defend the position.

In the regional elections in 2020 he stood as a STAN candidate in the Central Bohemia Region, where the whole party won, and he defended the position of an elected representative once again. In the total sum of preferential votes, he received the second highest number from voters: 12,243 votes.

In 2021 Rakušan received more than 60,000 first-preference votes, more than any other candidate in the 2021 Czech legislative election.

Views and attitudes 
Rakušan stated that the Czech Republic should support Israel but he also criticized the planned Israeli annexation of the Jewish settlements, that Israel has developed on the occupied Jordanian West Bank since 1967, which is territory that the Palestinians count on for their future state of Palestine.

In May 2020, he objected, in relation to the removal of the statue of the Russian marshal Konev in Prague 6, to the criticism expressed by the chairman of KSCM Vojtěch Filip in one of the Russian daily papers. It was the removal of the statue that Filip criticized in the daily.  According to Rakušan, Filip crossed the line. He also draws attention to the increasing power of Russian propaganda.

In recent years, he sees a similar problem in the obvious pressure and influence of China, which are also often mentioned in connection with the death of the then President of the Senate Jaroslav Kubera. According to him, China makes use of the Czech Republic not only as a tool of propaganda, but also from the point of view of industrial espionage. Attention to the influence of China and Russia is regularly drawn in the reports of BIS.

Vít Rakušan is a supporter of the idea of a simple, modern state, which should primarily serve its citizens, not hinder them. As part of his role as an elected representative, he tries to help citizens to improve and simplify life within the project Absurdity.

In the long term, he also subscribes to the ideas and legacy of former president Václav Havel.

References 

21st-century Czech politicians
1978 births
Living people
Mayors and Independents politicians
Members of the Chamber of Deputies of the Czech Republic (2017–2021)
People from Kolín
Members of the Chamber of Deputies of the Czech Republic (2021–2025)
Mayors and Independents Government ministers
Leaders of the Mayors and Independents
Interior ministers of the Czech Republic
Mayors of places in the Czech Republic
Charles University alumni